Olga Mihajlović was a Serbian pianist and Professor of Piano at the Belgrade Music Academy.

Performance career

Teaching career
She had taught at the Belgrade Music Academy (later named Faculty of Music in Belgrade) from 1939 to 1978.

References
Pedeset godina Fakulteta muzičke umetnosti (Muzičke akademije) 1937-1987 (1988), Univerzitet umetnosti u Beogradu, Beograd

External links
Faculty of Music in Belgrade
Association of Musical Artists of Serbia

Academic staff of the University of Arts in Belgrade
Serbian classical pianists
Possibly living people